Ileana Hocking (born 15 March 1959) is a Puerto Rican sprinter. She competed in the women's 400 metres at the 1976 Summer Olympics. Hocking finished seventh in the 1500 metres at the 1975 Pan American Games and sixth in the 1500 metres at the 1979 Pan American Games.

References

1959 births
Living people
Athletes (track and field) at the 1976 Summer Olympics
Puerto Rican female sprinters
Puerto Rican female middle-distance runners
Olympic track and field athletes of Puerto Rico
Athletes (track and field) at the 1975 Pan American Games
Athletes (track and field) at the 1979 Pan American Games
Pan American Games competitors for Puerto Rico
Place of birth missing (living people)
Central American and Caribbean Games medalists in athletics
20th-century Puerto Rican women